The Millionaire's Wife is a 2016 Philippine television drama romance series broadcast by GMA Network. It premiered on the network's Afternoon Prime line up from March 14, 2016 to June 24, 2016, replacing Destiny Rose.

Mega Manila ratings are provided by AGB Nielsen Philippines.

Series overview

Episodes

March 2016

April 2016

May 2016

June 2016

Episodes notes

References

Lists of Philippine drama television series episodes